The Rhone Rangers are a group of American winemakers who promote the use of grape varieties from the Rhône Valley. They are mostly based on the West Coast, particularly California, and have created  a not-for-profit organization for the promotion of wines containing at least 75% of the 22 Rhône grape varieties. The name is a pun on The Lone Ranger, and was coined by Wine Spectator to describe Randall Grahm for their 1989 April 15 issue, which featured Grahm dressed as the Lone Ranger under the title "The Rhône Ranger" (singular). The name was subsequently used for other winemakers.

Originally formed in the 1980s, without the name and with no formal structure or organization, the group disbanded in the early 1990s. It was revived again in the late 1990s and is considered a catalyst in making Syrah more prevalent in Californian wine. The structure is loosely based on that of the ZAP, which has been successful in promoting Zinfandel in the industry. Today its membership also includes wineries from Washington State, Oregon, Idaho, Michigan and Virginia.

History

In the 1980s, Randall Grahm of Bonny Doon Vineyard, Joseph Phelps of Joseph Phelps Winery, John MacCready of Sierra Vista Winery, Bill Crawford of McDowell Valley Vineyards, Fred Cline of Cline Cellars Winery, Steve Edmunds of Edmunds St. John and Bob Lindquist of Qupé Wine Cellars, among others, began popularizing the marketing of the Rhône varietals. Their success helped to revive plantings of many traditional Rhône grapes that were dying out in California like Grenache, Mourvedre and Viognier. Syrah also saw a dramatic increase in plantings after Gary Eberle, then with Estrella River Winery (now Meridian Vineyards) planted it in Paso Robles and made available the clone he used to other interested growers.  Beginning around 1990, a second wave of innovation in the Rhone Rangers movement began, which included investment and grapevine cuttings from the Rhone itself, as Château de Beaucastel entered into a partnership with American wine importer Robert Haas to found Tablas Creek Vineyard in Paso Robles.  Tablas Creek imported new clones of many of the 13 varieties allowed in Châteauneuf-du-Pape, including Grenache blanc, Counoise, and Picpoul blanc that had never before been used in California and made the clones available to other vineyards.  Other key innovators in this newer phase of development included Alban Vineyards, Domaine de la Terre Rouge, Unti Vineyards and Zaca Mesa Winery, many of whom also imported their own clones.

Styles
While Northern Rhone wines are often monovarietal, Southern Rhône wines are almost always blends.  Rhone Rangers wineries produce both varietal wines and blends depending on their stylistic preferences. Principal styles of red wines are:
"Châteauneuf-du-Pape" - (also known as GSM) various proportions of Grenache (for fruit and acidity), Syrah (for dark color, spice, and mineral) and Mourvedre (for tannin and structure), occasionally rounded out with minor amounts of other varieties to give complexity.
"Northern Rhone" - Syrah either 100% or blended with small amounts of Viognier.
Varietal - Grenache and Mourvedre, rarely found on their own in the Old World, are often produced as varietals by Rhone Rangers winemakers.
"Hot weather" - Grenache, Cinsault and Carignan in varying proportions for early drinking.
"Australian" - Syrah and Cabernet Sauvignon

Principal styles of white wines are:
Varietal - The white Rhone varieties Viognier, Marsanne and Roussanne, and increasingly Grenache blanc are produced as monovarietal wines by Rhone Rangers winemakers. 
"Hermitage Blanc" - Marsanne-Roussanne is the classic Northern Rhone blend for whites.
"Châteauneuf-du-Pape" - Blends based on Roussanne and Grenache blanc, often with additions of other white Rhone varieties.

Grape varieties

The main red varieties used in Rhône Rangers wine are Carignan, Cinsault, Counoise, Grenache, Mourvèdre, Muscardin, Syrah, Piquepoul Noir, Terret noir and Vaccarèse. Durif is a grape from southwest France, widely grown in California as Petite Sirah and is permitted in Rhone Rangers wines. In 2002, after DNA testing by ampelographers showed that Durif was a cross between Peloursin and the popular Rhône grape Syrah,  Petite Sirah was officially voted in as a member of the Rhône Ranger varieties.

The main white varieties are Bourboulenc, Clairette blanc, Grenache blanc, Marsanne, Muscat Blanc à Petits Grains, Picardin, Picpoul blanc, Roussanne, Ugni blanc and Viognier.

The Rhone Rangers Organization
The Rhone Rangers is based in Paso Robles, California and includes winery, grower, associate and consumer members.  Its mission statement is "advancing the knowledge and enjoyment of Rhone wines produced in America". It organizes trade and consumer tastings, seminars and dinners around the United States.  In recent years these tastings have visited San Francisco, Los Angeles, Seattle, Washington, DC and New York.  There are also local chapters in Paso Robles, Santa Barbara, El Dorado and the North Coast.

See also
 Côtes du Rhône
Gigondas AOC
Châteauneuf-du-Pape AOC

Notes and references

External links
 Official website

Wine terminology
Wine merchants